Efraín is a masculine Spanish given name, a cognate of Ephraim. Notable people with the name include:

 Efrain Chacurian (1924–2019), Argentine-born naturalised American soccer player
 Efraín Cortés (born 1984), Colombian football defender
 Efraín Escudero (born 1986), Mexican mixed martial arts fighter
 Efraín Flores (born 1958), Mexican football manager
 Efraín Forero Triviño (born 1931), Colombian cyclist
 Efraín Goldenberg (born 1929), Peruvian politician
 Efrain Gonzalez (born 1948), Puerto-Rico born New York senator
 Efrain Guigui (1925–2007), US-based Panamanian clarinetist and conductor.
 Efraín Guzmán (circa 1937–2002), Colombian guerrilla leader
 Efraín Huerta (1914–1982), Mexican poet
 Efraïn Jonckheer (1917–1987), Netherlands Antilles prime minister
 Efraín Juárez (born 1988), Mexican football player
 Efraín López Neris (born 1937), Puerto Rican actor
 Efraín Medina (born 1979), Mexican singer
 Efraín Morote (1921–1989), Peruvian anthropologist
 Efraín Ríos Montt (1926–2018), former de facto President of Guatemala
 Efraín Rivera Pérez (1951–2013), Associate Justice of the Supreme Court of Puerto Rico
 Efraín Sánchez (1926–2020), Colombian footballer
 Efraín Valdez (born 1966), Dominican Republic baseball player
 Efraín Velarde (born 1986), Mexican football player

Spanish masculine given names